"How About You" is a song by American rock band Staind. It was released on December 23, 2003, as the third single from the band's album 14 Shades of Grey. The song reached No. 10 on Billboard's Modern Rock and Mainstream Rock charts.

Charts

References

2004 singles
Staind songs
2003 songs
Elektra Records singles
Songs written by Aaron Lewis
Song recordings produced by Josh Abraham
Songs written by Mike Mushok